Johanna's skink (Flexiseps johannae) is a species of skink endemic to the Comoro Islands.

References

Reptiles described in 1880
Flexiseps
Taxa named by Albert Günther